Gonzalo Álvarez Chillida (born 1958) is a Spanish historian. He has been referred to as the leading Spanish expert in the study of antisemitism in Spain.

Biography 
Born in 1958 in San Sebastián. He earned a PhD at the  Autonomous University of Madrid (UAM). —his dissertation was titled José María Pemán: un contrarrevolucionario en la crisis española del siglo XX. He is tenured professor of the history of Thought and Social and Political Movements at the Complutense University of Madrid (UCM).

Works 
Author
 
 
Co-author

References 
Citations

Bibliography
 
 
 
 
 
 
 
 
 
 

Scholars of antisemitism
Academic staff of the Complutense University of Madrid
Autonomous University of Madrid alumni
20th-century Spanish historians
Historians of political thought
1958 births
Living people
21st-century Spanish historians